Qaraarx is a village and municipality in the Samukh Rayon of Azerbaijan. It has a population of 500.

References

Populated places in Samukh District